Lee Emanuel (born 24 January 1985) is an English middle-distance runner. He represented Great Britain at the 2014 and 2016 World Indoor Championships. In addition he won a silver medal at the 2015 European Indoor Championships. Lee attended the University of New Mexico where he won 2 indoor Mile titles in NCAA Indoor Track and Field.

Competition record

Personal bests
Outdoor
1500 metres – 3:36.35 (Heusden-Zolder 2015)
One mile – 3:54.75 (London 2013)
3000 metres – 7:51.30 (London 2015)
5000 metres – 13:31.56 (Walnut 2010)
Indoor
1500 metres – 3:35.66 (Birmingham 2015)
One mile – 3:54.30 (New York 2014)
3000 metres – 7:44.48 (Prague 2015)

References

1985 births
Living people
English male middle-distance runners
Sportspeople from Hastings
Commonwealth Games competitors for England
Athletes (track and field) at the 2010 Commonwealth Games
Athletes (track and field) at the 2014 Commonwealth Games